Philips's garra (Garra phillipsi) is a species of freshwater fish] in the family Cyprinidae. It is found only in Sri Lanka.

References

Garra
Freshwater fish of Sri Lanka
Fish described in 1933
Taxonomy articles created by Polbot